The Bourne Stone is an archaeological curiosity located in the town of Bourne, Massachusetts. The stone is a 300-pound chunk of granite, upon which two lines of carvings were made.

History 

According to the Archaeological Institute of America, the stone probably started as a doorstep of a Native American meeting house around 1680, then passed through several owners, landing at the Aptucxet Trading Post in Bourne about 1930. The stone has been displayed at the historical center since 2003.
 
In 2004, Larry J. Zimmerman explained his own theory about the Bourne Stone in Collaboration In Archaeological Practice: Engaging Descendant Communities. He invited Norse runic expert Michael Barnes to examine the stone.  Barnes stated that the markings were definitely not runic. Zimmerman and Patricia Emerson, Minnesota archaeologist, suggested that the markings looked like Native American petroglyphs.

References 

Bourne, Massachusetts
Inscriptions in unknown languages
North American runestone hoaxes
Pre-Columbian trans-oceanic contact